Firuz Shah Suri (died 1554) was the third ruler of the Suri dynasty. He was the son of Islam Shah Suri and succeeded him in 1554 when he was twelve years old. Firuz Shah Suri was assassinated within days of his coronation by Sher Shah Suri's nephew Muhammad Mubariz Khan, who later ruled as Muhammad Shah Adil.

See also
History of Bengal
History of India
Sur Empire

References 

1540s births
Sur Empire
16th-century Indian Muslims
16th-century Indian monarchs
Indian people of Pashtun descent
Indian people of Afghan descent
1554 deaths
1554 in India